Avtury (Evtara) is a rural locality (a selo) in Shalinsky District of the Chechen Republic, Russia, located on the Khulkhulau River,  east of Shali. Population:  

It was supposedly founded in the 14th century, soon after the area was abandoned by the Mongols and Tatars. During the Caucasian War, Avtury was a combat area between Imam Shamil and the Russian troops.

References

Rural localities in Shalinsky District